Leptodeira bakeri, the Aruban cat-eyed snake or Baker's cat-eyed snake, is a species of snake in the family Colubridae.  The species is native to Venezuela and Aruba.

References

Leptodeira
Snakes of South America
Reptiles of Venezuela
Reptiles described in 1936
Taxa named by Alexander Grant Ruthven